was a town located in Yatsuka District, Shimane Prefecture, Japan.

As of 2003, the town had an estimated population of 6,063 and a density of 164.58 per km2. The total area was 36.84 km2.

On March 31, 2005, Tamayu, along with the towns of Kashima, Mihonoseki, Shimane, Shinji and Yatsuka, and the village of Yakumo (all from Yatsuka District), was merged into the expanded city of Matsue.

It is noted for its hot spring, Tamatsukuri Onsen (Tamatsukuri meaning making of tama jewelry in ancient times.) The jewelry made there was mined on Mt. Kasensan. Noted for its production of Menou or Agate, a green quartz stone, this stone is one of the three gifts given to each newly crowned Emperor. The Onsen is recognized in the oldest of all Japanese history books. Today, it is a tourist destination for Japanese living in the western part of the country, although it is famous all over Japan. It hosts the  famous Onsen Matsuri, a summer festival that draws thousands of visitors each year, followed by a parade and beautiful sunsets on Lake Shinji. There are a couple of small temples and shrines that give a great perspective on regular warm Japanese people.

The Japanese dialect spoken here is Izumo-ben or Izumo dialect which can be difficult to understand but the people are warm and understanding.

Dissolved municipalities of Shimane Prefecture